European Football Coach of the Year was an annual prize in association football awarded to the best European manager or manager of European team in a calendar year, organized by European Union of Sports Press (fr. Union européenne de la presse sportive (UEPS), also known as AIPS Europe) since 2001. Previously it was awarded by the Association of European Journalists (AEJ, 1978–1997) and the Technical Commission of Torneo di Viareggio (1998–2000). The winner received a prize named after a prominent coach from the past. For the 2019–20 season, it was replaced by the newly formed UEFA Men's Coach of the Year Award.

Winners

Total wins by coaches

Total wins by country

See also

South American Coach of the Year
European Coach of the Season
UEFA Club Football Awards

References

Sources 
 Newspaper "Ukrainian Football", 24 January 2017, No.3—4

Euro
European football trophies and awards
Awards established in 1978